Football Club Nordsjælland, commonly known as FC Nordsjælland, (previously Farum BK) is a Danish women's football club based in Farum, Denmark. The club is currently playing in the Danish top division, the Elitedivisionen, and like the men's team, they play their home matches at the Right to Dream Park.

History
In 2018, FC Nordsjælland integrated Farum BK's U18 team as their women's football section. The team achieved promotion to Elitedivisionen after only one season in the 1. division.

Honours

Official
Elitedivisionen:
Bronze Medalist (1): 2020
Danish Women's Cup:
Winners (1): 2020

Players

Current squad

Former players
For details of former players, see :Category:FC Nordsjælland (women) players.

Footnotes and references

External links
Official website 

FC Nordsjælland
Nordsjaelland, F.C.
Women's football clubs in Denmark
Association football clubs established in 2017
2017 establishments in Denmark
Furesø Municipality